Baboquivari National Forest was established as the Baboquivari Forest Reserve by the U.S. Forest Service in Arizona on November 5, 1906, with .  On March 4, 1907, it became a National Forest, and on July 1, 1908, the entire forest was combined with Huachuca National Forest and Tumacacori National Forest to establish Garces National Forest. The name was discontinued. 

The forest included part of the Huachuca Mountains, one of the Madrean Sky Islands. The lands are presently part of the Sierra Vista District of Coronado National Forest.

See also
 Baboquivari Peak Wilderness

References

External links
 Coronado National Forest
 Forest History Society
 Listing of the National Forests of the United States and Their Dates (from the Forest History Society website) Text from Davis, Richard C., ed. Encyclopedia of American Forest and Conservation History. New York: Macmillan Publishing Company for the Forest History Society, 1983. Vol. II, pp. 743-788.

Former National Forests of Arizona
Coronado National Forest
Protected areas established in 1906
1906 establishments in Arizona Territory
1908 disestablishments in Arizona Territory
Protected areas disestablished in 1908